K. Baladhandayutham (April 2, 1918 – May 31, 1973) was an Indian Tamil politician from the Communist Party of India.

Politics 
He was Member of 5th Lok Sabha representing Coimbatore Lok Sabha constituency.

Death 
He was killed in the crash of Indian Airlines Flight 440 on May 31, 1973 at the age of 55.

Legacy 
The Communist Party of India Tamil Nadu State headquarters, Balan Illam, is named in his honor.

References

India MPs 1971–1977
Lok Sabha members from Tamil Nadu
Politicians from Coimbatore
Communist Party of India politicians from Tamil Nadu
1918 births
1973 deaths